Jason Bohannon (born 30 December 1987) is an American professional basketball player who last played for USC Heidelberg in Germany. He plays mainly as a shooting guard.

College career
On January 24, 2010, Bohannon reached the 1,000 point milestone during a 79–71 overtime win over the Penn State Nittany Lions.

Accomplishments
College:

Big Ten Sixth Man of the Year in 2008

Member of Big Ten Regular Season Championship Team and Tournament championship Team in 2008

High School:

Iowa Mr. Basketball in 2006

Iowa Gatorade Player of the Year in Iowa in 2006

Iowa Newspaper Association All-State first team in 2004, 2005, and 2006

Iowa High School State Championship in 2004

Iowa High School State Runner-up in 2005

Iowa High School State 4th place in 2006

Stats
High School:
2003–2004: averaged 16.5 points, 5.2 rebounds and 3.1 assists

2004–2005: averaged 20.8 points, 4.5 rebounds and 4.0 assists

2005–2006: averaged 27 points, 5.8 rebounds and 3.8 assists

Career High: 45 points

College:

2006–07:
Games Played: 33
Games Started: 0
Averages: 15.0 min, 4.6 points, 1.1 assists, 1.5 rebounds, 44.5% field goals, 36.5% threes, 83.9% free throws

2007–08:
Games Played: 36
Games Started: 2
Averages: 26.3 min, 8.2 points, 1.4 assists, 2.4 rebounds, 42.9% field goals, 39.3% threes, 86.7% free throws

2008–09
Games Played: 33
Games Started: 33
Averages: 33.1 min, 10.3 points, 1.7 assists, 3.1 rebounds, 38.1% field goals, 36.6% threes, 81.0% free throws

2009–10
Games Played: 31
Games Started: 31
Averages: 36.6 min, 11.8 points, 2.2 assists, 3.6 rebounds, 46.5% field goals, 40.2% threes, 87.0% free throws

Career Highs: 43 min, 30 points, 5 assists, 9 reb, 3 steals, 11–16 field goals, 7–11 threes, 6–6 free throws

Professional career
Bohannon made the NBA D-League's Iowa Energy after trying out for the team during the summer of 2010. He was waived on November 17 then re-signed with the Energy just six weeks later.

Later that season, he signed with USC Heidelberg, a basketball team in Germany.

Personal life
Bohannon's father, Gordy, played quarterback for Iowa. Bohannon has three brothers, Jordan, Matt and Zach. Jordan played basketball for Iowa. Matt played for Northern Iowa, and Zach played for Air Force and Wisconsin.

References

External links
Biography on Wisconsin Badgers

1987 births
Living people
American expatriate basketball people in Germany
Basketball players from Iowa
Iowa Energy players
People from Marion, Iowa
Point guards
Shooting guards
Sportspeople from Cedar Rapids, Iowa
Wisconsin Badgers men's basketball players
American men's basketball players
Linn-Mar High School alumni